Dhakla is a village located in Jhajjar district in the Indian state of Haryana. It has distance of 15.5 km from Kosli Railway Station  and approximately  21 km from Jhajjar Railway Station.

Health & Education: Dhakla has Community Health Centre (CHC Dhakla) with ambulance facility by State Govt. & has two Government School, One Private School.

Demographics
In 2011, the population was 4,333.

Religion
Majority of the residents are Hindu (Brahmins,  Bania,Lohars,Carpenters, Jats, all SC ST BC casts) All ObC and others. Nearly 20 or more casts.

Prominent residents
Cabinet Minister in Haryana Government O. P. Dhankar hails from Dhakla.

Ch.Badlu Ram, (Ch.Kanwal Singh Number dar, Ch.Dheer Singh Arya- Both did hardwork for whole village's Vanshavali and history of village Dhakka and both respected people of the village), DIG-ITBP Dharampal Dhankhar.

See also 
 Sarola
 Subana
 Khudan
 Chhapar, Jhajjar
 Girdharpur, Jhajjar

References 

Villages in Jhajjar district